Alisia Jenkins (born February 21, 1994) is an American professional basketball player who plays for Ramat Hasharon and the Washington Mystics in the Women's National Basketball Association (WNBA). She played college basketball at South Florida.

College career
Jenkins came out of high school as the 83rd ranked forward in the 2012 Class per ESPN's HoopGurlz rankings. She committed to play for the South Florida Bulls. She also considered Temple, Marshall, Georgia Southern, and Tennessee Tech.

During her freshman season, Jenkins scored 200 points and grabbed 199 rebounds, and was named to the Big East All-Freshman Team. When South Florida moved from the Big East to the American Athletic Conference, Jenkins continued to make the All-Conference teams. She was a two-time All-Second team during her sophomore and junior seasons, while making the All-Third team during her senior season.

During her senior season, Jenkins also became the USF all-time leader in rebounding - surpassing a record that had stood for 26 years.

College statistics

Professional career

WNBA
Jenkins went undrafted in the 2016 WNBA draft. She signed a training camp contract with the New York Liberty in 2016, but did not make the roster. 

Jenkins made her WNBA debut during the 2020 WNBA season, when she signed with the Indiana Fever. She was waived by the Fever on August 28, 2023. Jenkins signed with the Chicago Sky on a 7-Day Contract 3 days after being waived by the Fever. After her 7-Day Contract was up, Jenkins signed with the Phoenix Mercury.

On February 2, 2023, Jenkins signed a training camp contract with the Washington Mystics.

WNBA career statistics

Regular season

|-
| align="left" | 2020
| align="left" | Indiana
| 1 || 0 || 2.0 || .000 || .000 || .000 || 1.0 || 0.0 || 0.0 || 0.0 || 0.0 || 0.0
|-
| align="left" | 2020
| align="left" | Chicago
| 2 || 0 || 1.5 || .000 || .000 || .000 || 0.0 || 0.0 || 0.0 || 0.0 || 0.0 || 0.0
|-
| align="left" | 2020
| align="left" | Phoenix
| 2 || 0 || 11.5 || .250 || .000 || .667 || 1.5 || 0.0 || 0.0 || 0.0 || 1.5 || 4.0
|-
| align="left" | Career
| align="left" | 1 year, 3 teams
| 5 || 0 || 5.6 || .250 || .000 || .667 || 0.8 || 0.0 || 0.0 || 0.0 || 0.6 || 1.6

References

External links
WNBA bio
USF Bulls bio

1994 births
Living people
American expatriate basketball people in Israel
American women's basketball players
Basketball players from Georgia (U.S. state)
Chicago Sky players
Indiana Fever players
People from Statesboro, Georgia
Phoenix Mercury players
Power forwards (basketball)
South Florida Bulls women's basketball players